Anna Kay Faris (born November 29, 1976) is an American actress. She rose to prominence for her work in comedic roles, particularly the lead part of Cindy Campbell in the Scary Movie film series (2000–2006).

Her film credits include The Hot Chick (2002), Lost in Translation (2003), Brokeback Mountain (2005), Just Friends (2005), My Super Ex-Girlfriend (2006), Smiley Face (2007), The House Bunny (2008), What's Your Number? (2011), The Dictator (2012), and Overboard (2018). She has also had voice-over roles in the film series Cloudy with a Chance of Meatballs (2009–2013) and Alvin and the Chipmunks (2009–2015), as well as The Emoji Movie (2017).

On television, Faris had a recurring role as Erica in the final season of the NBC sitcom Friends (2004) and starred as Christy Plunkett in the CBS sitcom Mom (2013–2020). In 2015, Faris launched Unqualified, an advice podcast, and in 2017, her memoir of the same name was published, which became a New York Times Best Seller.

Early life
Faris was born on November 29, 1976, in Baltimore, Maryland, the second child of Jack, a sociology professor, and Karen Faris, a special education teacher. Both her parents, natives of Seattle, Washington, were living in Baltimore as her father had accepted a professorship at Towson University. When Faris was six, the family moved to Edmonds, Washington. Her father worked at the University of Washington as a vice president of internal communications, and later headed the Washington Biotechnology and Biomedical Association, while her mother taught at Seaview Elementary School in Edmonds.

Faris has an older brother, Robert, who is also a sociologist and professor at the University of California, Davis. In interviews, she has described her parents as "ultra liberal" and said that she and her brother were raised in an irreligious but "very conservative", traditional atmosphere. At age six, her parents enrolled her in a community drama class for children, as they usually encouraged her to act. She enjoyed watching plays and eventually produced her own material in her bedroom with neighborhood friends. She has said in interviews she often imagined her orthodontal retainer talking to her, and that she pictured herself "on talk shows to talk about [her] talking retainer".

Faris attended Edmonds-Woodway High School (where she graduated in 1994), and while studying, performed onstage with a Seattle repertory company and in nationally broadcast radio plays. She once described herself as "a drama-club dork," and said she used to wear a Christmas-tree skirt in school. She then attended the University of Washington, where she earned a degree in English literature in 1999. Despite her love of acting, she admitted she "never really thought [she] wanted to become a movie star" and continued to act "just to make some extra money," hoping one day to publish a novel. After graduating from college, she was going to travel to London, where she had a receptionist job lined up at an ad agency. However, she ended up living in Los Angeles "at the last minute," once she committed to the idea of pursuing acting. Shortly afterwards, she obtained the starring role in Scary Movie. At 22, she lived in a studio apartment at The Ravenswood in Hancock Park.

Career

Early acting credits (1986–1999)
Encouraged by her parents to pursue acting when she was young, she gave her first professional performance at age nine in a three-month run of Arthur Miller's play Danger: Memory! at the Seattle Repertory Theater. She made US$250 for the role, which was "huge" for her at the time. "I felt like I was rolling in the dough," she recalled. She went on to play Scout in a production of To Kill a Mockingbird at the Village Theatre in Issaquah, Washington, the title character in Heidi,  and Rebecca in Our Town. Her theatre credits during that period included productions of Rain, Some Fish, No Elephants, and  Life Under Water.

While in high school, she appeared in a television commercial for a frozen yogurt brand, and in a training video for Red Robin. On the latter, she said in May 2012: "I play, like, the perfect hostess. And I think they still use it."

Faris played brief roles in the made-for-TV film Deception: A Mother's Secret and the independent drama Eden, the latter of which screened at the 1996 Sundance Film Festival. Her first major film role came shortly after college, in the independent slasher film Lovers Lane (1999), in which she played an ill-fated cheerleader. A B-movie, it received a straight-to-DVD release. Critical reception was mixed, but for her part, Faris garnered her first acting reviews by writers; efilmcritic.com Greg Muskewitz found her the film's "one center of interest".

Breakthrough with Scary Movie (2000–2006)
Faris's breakout role came in 2000 when she starred in the horror-comedy parody film Scary Movie, portraying Cindy Campbell, a play on the character of Sidney Prescott (Neve Campbell) in the slasher thriller Scream. It marked her first starring credit, as she had appeared only in small and supporting parts in theater plays and low-budget features. She found the experience a "great boot camp" for her, as she told UK's The Guardian in 2009, explaining that she "hadn't done much before that. With those movies, you have to be so exact with your props and the physical comedy and everything, so it was a great training ground." Scary Movie was a major commercial success, ranking atop the box office charts with a US$42 million opening weekend gross. It went on to earn US$278 million worldwide. For her performance, Faris received nominations for the Breakthrough Female Performance and Best Kiss Awards at the 2001 MTV Movie Awards. She subsequently reprised her role in Scary Movie 2, released on July 4, 2001.

Her next film role was that of the lesbian colleague of a lonely and traumatized young woman in the independent psychological thriller May (2002), which premiered at the Sundance Film Festival and was released in selected theaters. In its review, The Digital Fix found it "one of the finest examples of independent American genre filmmaking" and asserted that Faris played her role "with an infectious level of enthusiasm, frequently skirting the border between a believable performance and one that is completely over the top, but always managing to come down on the right side." Later in 2002, she starred alongside Rob Schneider and Rachel McAdams in the comedy The Hot Chick, about a teenage girl whose mind is magically swapped with that of a 30-year-old criminal. It was a modest commercial success, grossing US$54 million worldwide.

In 2003, Faris was "cast last-minute" opposite Bill Murray and Scarlett Johansson in Sofia Coppola's drama Lost in Translation, where she played a "bubbly, extroverted" actress getting in with an aging actor in Tokyo. She felt the film gave her the chance to get people to know her body of work a "little more," and called it "the best experience of [her] life" at the time. While Variety remarked that Faris "contributes an amusing turn" as her "vacuous movie star" character, New York Times concluded that the actress, "who barely registers in the Scary Movie pictures—and she's the star—comes to full, lovable and irritating life as a live-wire starlet [...] this movie will secure her a career." Budgeted at US$4 million, Lost in Translation grossed US$119.7 million globally. She portrayed Cindy Campbell for the third time in 2003's Scary Movie 3.

In 2004, Faris debuted on the last season of the sitcom Friends in the recurring role of Erica, the mother whose twin babies are adopted by Chandler and Monica; and in the summer that year, she filmed a small part in Ang Lee's drama Brokeback Mountain (2005). As her character had just "one scene in the movie," she only spent two days on set in Calgary. For the film, Faris, along with her co-stars, received a Screen Actors Guild Award nomination for Outstanding Performance by a Cast in a Motion Picture.

Faris starred in the 2005 comedies Waiting... and Just Friends, both alongside Ryan Reynolds. Waiting... was an independent production about restaurant employees who collectively stave off boredom and adulthood with their antics. Budgeted at US$3 million, it made US$18.6 million, but a View London reviewer, remarking that the director had "assembled a decent comic cast," felt that "he gives them practically nothing to do. Reynolds and [...] Faris were hilarious together in Just Friends, so it's a shame that their talents are so wasted here." In Just Friends, Faris portrayed Samantha James, an emerging, self-obsessed pop singer landing in New Jersey with a formerly overweight nerd (played by co-star Reynolds), now a successful record producer. It grossed US$50.9 million around the globe, and earned Faris nominations for an MTV Movie Award and two Teen Choice Awards.

Faris played Cindy Campbell for the fourth and final time in Scary Movie 4, which premiered on April 14, 2006. It was intended as the final chapter in the franchise, but a fifth feature was released on April 12, 2013; Faris did not return to appear in it. In 2006, she also appeared opposite Uma Thurman and Luke Wilson in Ivan Reitman's romantic comedy My Super Ex-Girlfriend, playing Hannah, the co-worker of a man (Wilson) dating a neurotic and aggressive superhero (Thurman). While critical response was mixed, it made US$61 million worldwide, and Faris and Thurman both got MTV Movie Award nominations for Best Fight.

Continued comedic roles (2007–2012)

In Gregg Araki's independent stoner comedy Smiley Face (2007), Faris starred as Jane F, a young woman who has a series of misadventures after eating a large number of cupcakes laced with cannabis. It premiered at the Sundance Film Festival and received a limited theatrical release in Los Angeles. Reviews were largely positive; according to the film-critics aggregate site Rotten Tomatoes, writers agreed that her "bright performance and Gregg Araki's sharp direction" made the film "more than [the] average stoner comedy." It earned her the "Stonette of the Year" prize at High Times magazine's Stony Awards.

She appeared opposite Diane Keaton and Jon Heder in the independent  comedy Mama's Boy, playing an aspiring singer and the love interest of a self-absorbed 29-year-old (Heder). Distributed for a limited release to certain parts of the United States only, Mama's Boy premiered on November 30, 2007, to lukewarm critical and commercial responses. She followed it with a starring part in a mainstream feature, Fred Wolf's comedy The House Bunny, where she appeared as Shelley, a former Playboy bunny who signs up to be the "house mother" of an unpopular university sorority after being expelled from the Playboy Mansion. Although it received average reviews, critics were unanimously favorable towards Faris's part, most of them agreeing, according to website Rotten Tomatoes, that she was "game" in what they called a "middling, formulaic comedy." The film was released on August 22, 2008, in the US, and made US$70 million in its global theatrical run.

Faris's first movie of 2009 was the British science fiction-comedy Frequently Asked Questions About Time Travel, which follows two social outcasts and their cynical friend as they attempt to navigate a time-travel conundrum in the middle of a British pub. Faris played Cassie, a girl from the future who sets the adventure in motion. The Guardian described her appearance as a "bewildered cameo". It received a theatrical release only in the UK, and later had several television premiere airings across Europe. 

In the black comedy Observe and Report (2009), Faris co-starred opposite Seth Rogen, portraying a bitchy cosmetic counter employee on whom Rogen has a crush. She was drawn to appear in the movie, as it gave Faris the opportunity to play an "awful character" rather than the usual "roles where you have to win the audience over or win the guy over, and be charming." Controversy arose regarding a scene where Rogen has sex with Faris's intoxicated character, with various advocacy groups commenting that it constituted date rape. Budgeted at US$18 million, Observe and Report made US$26 million. Faris voiced a weather intern and the love interest of a wannabe scientist in the animated Cloudy with a Chance of Meatballs as well as Jeanette Miller (one of the chipettes) in the live-action hybrid Alvin and the Chipmunks: The Squeakquel, both of which were box office successes.

Faris starred in the computer-animated live-action film Yogi Bear as a nature documentary filmmaker befriending the titular character. It was released by Warner Bros. on December 17, 2010, receiving largely negative reviews, with many critics unimpressed by its screenplay. The Hollywood Reporter, while admitting to find her "very talented" in its verdict, wondered "what on earth" made her agree to play her role. The film, however, made US$201 million worldwide.

Faris's subsequent film release was the retro comedy Take Me Home Tonight, about a group of friends partying on one summer night during the 1980s. Filmed in 2007, it received a wide theatrical release four years later, on March 4, 2011, to negative reviews and lackluster earnings. Faris, however, obtained a Teen Choice Award nomination for Choice Movie Actress – Comedy. She next had the starring part and served as executive producer of What's Your Number?, where she appeared with Chris Evans. In the movie, she played a woman who looks back at the past 19 men she's had relationships with and wonders if one of them might be her one true love. It garnered generally mediocre reviews, who concluded that the "comic timing" of Faris was "sharp as always," but felt it was wasted in "this predictable, boilerplate comedy." It was released on September 30, 2011, and made US$30 million worldwide. She also reprised her voice-over role in Alvin and the Chipmunks: Chipwrecked, released on December 16, 2011.

Her next film role was that of a human rights activist befriending a childish autocrat in the political satire The Dictator (2012), co-starring Sacha Baron Cohen. Faris, who was eager to work with Baron Cohen as she had been his fan "for years," stated that "90 percent" of the acting in the film was improvised. Critics gave it decent reviews, with Faris's role garnering a similar reception; Los Angeles Times called her "the film's standout" and stated that when "she opens her mouth, that rasp that has made her so much fun to watch (the "Scary Movie" franchise most memorably) takes hold and turns the dialogue inside out. The kind of true-believer purity she brings to Zoey's eco-terrorizing rants comes close to stealing Baron Cohen's comic thunder." The picture was a box office success, grossing US$179 million globally, and earned Faris the Star of the Year Award at the National Association of Theatre Owners.

Mom and Unqualified (2013–present)

In 2013, Faris acted for the third time with then-husband Chris Pratt, following Take Me Home Tonight and What's Your Number? in a segment of Movie 43, an independent anthology black comedy that featured 14 different storylines, with each segment having a different director. The film was universally panned by critics, with the Chicago Sun-Times calling it "the Citizen Kane of awful." In the British romantic comedy I Give It a Year (2013), Faris played an old flame of a writer (Rafe Spall) who hastily tied the knot. Released shortly after Movie 43, the film received mixed reviews and was a commercial success in the UK.

Faris obtained the main role of the CBS sitcom series Mom, which debuted on September 23, 2013. Her character is Christy, a newly sober single mom who tries to pull her life together in Napa Valley. As she landed the part, the show gave Faris, who had guest-starred in various television programs until then, her first full-time television role. Throughout its eight-season run, the sitcom has become the third most-watched comedy on television, and has received generally favorable reviews; Vulture called her "the most talented comic actress of her generation," and Boston Herald critic, Mark A. Perigard wrote in his verdict: "This is dark material, yet Faris balances it with a genuine winsomeness, able to wring laughs out of the most innocuous lines." She has been nominated for one Prism Award and two People's Choice Awards. In 2020, Faris left the show after seven seasons.

Faris reprised her voice-role in the animated science-fiction comedy sequel Cloudy with a Chance of Meatballs 2, released in theaters four days after Mom premiered on television. Like the first film, Meatballs 2 was a commercial success, grossing US$274.3 million worldwide. The following year, she had an uncredited cameo in the closing-credits sequence of the action-comedy 22 Jump Street, appearing in a segment called 30 Jump Street: Flight Academy.

Faris and Mom co-star Allison Janney hosted the 41st People's Choice Awards, which were held January 7, 2015. In November, she launched Unqualified, a free-form advice podcast; along with producer Sim Sarna, she is the host of the show, which consists of interviews with celebrities and cultural figures, followed by personal phone-calls to listeners asking for relationship and other advice. Faris was inspired to create the podcast after listening to Serial, and explaining the evolution of the idea, she said: "I love to talk about relationships; that's all I want to talk about with my friends. And then I just thought, I kind of want a hobby [...] So I started asking around to some friends, and I asked this technical producer guy what equipment I should buy on Amazon. And I just started recording my friends when they would come over. And then with my dear friend Sim, we started flushing out the whole thing, which clearly there's still a lot more flushing out to do. It started out as a dinky hobby." As of May 2021, 249 episodes have been released.

Faris reprised her voice-over role in The Road Chip, the fourth installment in the Alvin and the Chipmunks film series. In 2016, she had a brief appearance as an exaggerated version of herself in the action-comedy Keanu, and starred in the music video for the song "Hold On To Me" by Mondo Cozmo. In 2017, Faris voiced one of the lead characters, Jailbreak, in the CG animated comedy The Emoji Movie (originally set to be voiced by Ilana Glazer), which was universally panned by critics.

Faris published her first book, Unqualified, in October 2017; it was described as part "memoir […] part humorous, unflinching advice from her hit podcast." The memoir became one of the "top 20 blockbuster books of autumn," according to Amazon, and received a positive critical response; The New York Times found the book to be "goofily self-deprecating, casually profane and occasionally raw, earnest and blunt, like Ms. Faris herself," and The Ringer remarked: "Unqualified is observant, sharp, and startlingly revealing, not only about Faris's romantic history, but of the broader discrepancies between modern male and female Hollywood stardom writ large."

In Overboard (2018), a remake of the 1987 film of the same name starring Goldie Hawn and Kurt Russell, Faris played a single, working-class mother who convinces a spoiled wealthy playboy (Eugenio Derbez) with amnesia that they are married. While publications such as IndieWire and Film Inquiry praised the chemistry between Derbez and Faris, most critics felt that the film made "poor use of the ever-charming" Faris. Her first leading film role since 2011's What's Your Number, Overboard was a commercial success, grossing over US$91.2 million worldwide.

Public image

During her career, Faris has been called one of the "most talented comedic actresses" of her generation by several publications. Cosmopolitan magazine named her "the Cosmo's Fun Fearless Female of the Year" in 2010, and Tad Friend described her in The New Yorker as "Hollywood's most original comedic actress." A Vulture article called Faris "her generation's Goldie Hawn" and she has been often compared to comedian Lucille Ball. The Wrap, likening her to Ball, asserted the actress "has impeccable timing and isn't afraid to cast dignity aside in pursuit of a hearty laugh," while NPR described her as "Hawn's heir apparent—a modern-day Lucille Ball with an up-for-anything mania and a gift for the low arts of slapstick and pulling faces."

Although some of her movies have been critically panned or flopped at the box office, Faris remains often acclaimed for her portrayals in most of them; The A.V. Club once stated it was a "pleasure to watch" Faris on screen and described her as "a gifted, likeable comedian who tends to be the best element of many terrible movies." Slate magazine's Dana Stevens wrote in her review for Faris's vehicle What's Your Number?: "More than any contemporary comedienne I can think of [...] Faris demonstrates this fearless anything-for-a-laugh quality. It would be wonderful to see her in a movie that tested the limits of that audacity, rather than forcing her to tamp it down." Most critics agree that her 2007 independent comedy Smiley Face remains one of her best films; Los Angeles Times remarked that this film was "an opportunity for the actress to show that she can carry a movie composed of often hilarious nonstop misadventures. No matter how outrageously or foolishly Faris' Jane behaves, she remains blissfully appealing—such are Faris' fearless comedic skills and the freshness of her radiant blond beauty."

Faris has appeared on the covers and photo sessions of several magazines throughout her career; she graced the September 2000 cover of Raygun, and in subsequent years the list has included Playboy, Self, Cosmopolitan, among others. She was featured in GQ UK June 2001 pictorial of "Young Hollywood." She has been listed as No. 57, No. 39, No. 42 and No. 44 in Maxim magazine's "Hot 100" in 2004, 2009, 2010 and 2011 respectively. In 2009, she was ranked No. 60 in FHM "100 Sexiest Women in the World," and ranked No. 96 on the same list in 2010. Ask Men also featured her as No. 78 on its 2009 "100 Most Desirable Women in the World" list.

Personal life

Faris started dating actor Ben Indra shortly after they met on the set of the 1999 indie slasher film Lovers Lane. They married in June 2004. Faris filed for divorce in April 2007 citing irreconcilable differences. As part of their divorce agreement in February 2008, she agreed to pay Indra $900,000 in addition to other property and acting royalties.

During her divorce from Indra and after filming The House Bunny, Faris got breast implants, which she first revealed in an interview with The New Yorker in April 2011. She said it  "wasn't a career thing—it was a divorce thing", and recalled in her memoir Unqualified that she had previously been insecure about her breasts.

Faris met actor Chris Pratt in early 2007 at the table read in Los Angeles for the film Take Me Home Tonight where their characters were love interests. They started dating shortly after, became engaged in late 2008, and married on July 9, 2009, in a small ceremony in Bali, Indonesia, eloping on a whim after a friend's wedding. They have a son, Jack, who was born on August 25, 2012, nine weeks premature and spent a month in intensive care before going home. The family lived in the Hollywood Hills, Los Angeles. On August 6, 2017, the couple announced their separation, and filed for divorce on December 1, 2017. On October 16, 2018, it was announced that it had been finalized.

In September 2017 Faris reportedly began dating cinematographer Michael Barrett, whom she met while working on the film Overboard. In a February 2020 appearance on The Late Late Show with James Corden, she confirmed rumors of their engagement. In 2021, she confirmed they had married in a courthouse ceremony in Washington State.

During a Thanksgiving 2019 dinner,  Faris and her guests began experiencing mysterious health symptoms in a Lake Tahoe rental cottage. Local first responders detected carbon monoxide levels six times the recommended maximum.

Filmography

Film

Television

Podcasting

Bibliography 
 Unqualified;  (2017)

Soundtrack appearances

Awards and nominations

References

Further reading

External links

Anna Faris credits at the American Film Institute

 

1976 births
20th-century American actresses
21st-century American actresses
Actresses from Baltimore
Actresses from Seattle
American child actresses
American film actresses
American women podcasters
American podcasters
American television actresses
American voice actresses
Living people
People from Edmonds, Washington
People from Snohomish County, Washington
University of Washington College of Arts and Sciences alumni
Comedians from Maryland
Comedians from Washington (state)
20th-century American comedians
21st-century American comedians
American women memoirists
American memoirists